The Agnew Hunter Bahnson House is a historic house located at Winston-Salem, Forsyth County, North Carolina.

Description and history 
It was designed by architect Willard C. Northup and built in 1920. It is a large two-story, asymmetrical, stuccoed English Cottage style dwelling with a Colonial Revival interior. It has a cross-gable roof with a hipped roof over a long wing. It was built by Agnew Hunter Bahnson, one of Winston-Salem's most prominent industrialists.

It was listed on the National Register of Historic Places on April 12, 2001.

References

Houses on the National Register of Historic Places in North Carolina
Colonial Revival architecture in North Carolina
Houses completed in 1920
Houses in Winston-Salem, North Carolina
National Register of Historic Places in Winston-Salem, North Carolina